Martin Hoffmann (born 22 March 1955 in Gommern) is a former German footballer and manager.

Career

Playing career
Hoffmann played from 1973 to 1985 for 1. FC Magdeburg in the East German top division, amassing 256 matches and scoring 78 goals. With Magdeburg, he won the league title in 1974 and 1975, and the cup title in 1978, 1979 and 1983. The biggest title of all is the European Cup Winners' Cup, as Magdeburg defeated AC Milan 2–0 on 8 May 1974 in Rotterdam.

He also played for the East Germany national football team, making 62 appearances and scoring 15 goals between 1973 and 1981. In 1974, he played in six matches for East Germany in the 1974 FIFA World Cup, scoring once against Chile. In 1976, he was in the East German team which won the gold medal in the 1976 Summer Olympics in Montreal, playing in 5 matches and scoring once in the final against Poland.

Coaching career
He worked as manager of 1. FC Magdeburg in the twice, from 1994 to 1996 and from 2002 to 2003. In the 1996–97 season, he briefly managed Mecklenburg-based Parchimer FC, but left the club in the winterbreak.

Honours
UEFA Cup Winners' Cup: 1
Winner 1974
DDR-Oberliga: 2
Winner 1974, 1975
Runner-up 1977, 1978
FDGB-Pokal: 3
Winner 1978, 1979, 1983
Olympic football tournament: 1
Gold medal Montreal 1976

References

External links
 

1955 births
Living people
People from Gommern
German footballers
East German footballers
Footballers at the 1976 Summer Olympics
Olympic footballers of East Germany
Olympic gold medalists for East Germany
1974 FIFA World Cup players
East Germany international footballers
1. FC Magdeburg players
1. FC Magdeburg managers
Olympic medalists in football
DDR-Oberliga players
Medalists at the 1976 Summer Olympics
Association football forwards
Footballers from Saxony-Anhalt
German football managers
People from Bezirk Magdeburg
East German football managers